Sigma Piscium (Sigma Psc, σ Piscium, σ Psc) is a main-sequence star in the zodiac constellation of Pisces. It has an apparent magnitude of +5.50, meaning it is barely visible to the naked eye, according to the Bortle scale. While parallax measurements by the Hipparcos spacecraft give a distance of approximately 430 light years (133 parsecs), dynamical parallax measurements put it slightly closer, at 368 light-years (113 parsecs) from Earth.

Sigma Piscium is a spectroscopic binary system, meaning the components of the system have been detected from periodic Doppler shifts in their spectra. In this case, light from both stars can be detected and it is double-lined. It has an orbital period of 81 days, and the orbit is relatively eccentric, at about 0.9. Both components are B-type main-sequence stars.

Sigma Piscium is moving through the Milky Way at a speed of 23.5 km/s relative to the Sun. Its projected galactic orbit carries it between 24,300 and 29,400 light years from the center of the galaxy.

Sigma Piscium was a latter designation of 40 Andromedae.

Naming

References

Piscium, Sigma
Pisces (constellation)
B-type main-sequence stars
Spectroscopic binaries
Piscium, 069
004889
0291
006918
Durchmusterung objects